Teres I (reigned 460–445 BC) was the first king of the Odrysian kingdom of Thrace. Thrace had nominally been part of the Persian empire since 516 BC during the rule of Darius the Great, and was re-subjugated by Mardonius in 492 BC.

The Odrysian state was the first Thracian kingdom that acquired power in the region, by the unification of many Thracian tribes under a single ruler, King Teres probably in the 460's after the Persian defeat in Greece. Teres, who united the 40 or more Thracian tribes under one banner, was well known for his military abilities and spent much of his life on the battlefield. He died during a military campaign in 445 BC. Historians argue it was against the Triballi, a Thracian tribe occupying a large amount of land to the north of Thrace. He was succeeded by his second son, Sitalces, who seemed to have taken on his father's fighting prowess and used all the tribes to wage war with Macedon.

Teres Ridge on Livingston Island in the South Shetland Islands, Antarctica, is named for Teres.

Family
He had issue:
 Sitalces king of Thracian Odryses, father of Amadocus I.
 Maisades, father of Seuthes II.
 Sparatocos, father of Seuthes I.

References

445 BC deaths
5th-century BC rulers
5th-century BC Greek people
Year of birth unknown
Odrysian kings